The EOC 10-inch 45 calibre gun were various similar 10-inch naval guns designed and manufactured by Elswick Ordnance Company to equip ships they built and/or armed for several countries before World War I.

History

Italian service
Elswick supplied later, more powerful "Pattern W" models of its 10-inch 45-calibre guns for the  armoured cruisers. In Italian service these were known as the Cannone da 254/45 A Modello 1906.

Japanese service
The Katori-class battleship Kashima had a secondary armament of four single-gun turrets positioned on each side of the ships superstructure.  In Japanese service these guns were known as 10-inch/45 Type 41 naval guns.

UK service
Elswick supplied 5 of their 10-inch 45-calibre guns for use on the battleship Constitución that they were building for Chile. Britain took the ship over in 1903 as HMS Swiftsure, and the guns were designated BL 10 inch Mk VI in UK service. These guns fired a  projectile using  of cordite MD propellant.

See also
List of naval guns

Weapons of comparable role, performance and era
 Vickers 10-inch /45 naval gun : Vickers equivalent

Notes

References

External links
Tony DiGiulian, British 10"/45 (25.4 cm) Marks VI and VII
Tony DiGiulian, Italy 10"/45 (25.4 cm) Model 1908 

Naval guns of the United Kingdom
Naval guns of Italy
254 mm artillery
Elswick Ordnance Company